The Super Bowl 50 Halftime Show took place on February 7, 2016, at Levi's Stadium in Santa Clara, California as part of Super Bowl 50. It was headlined by the British rock group Coldplay with special guest performers Beyoncé and Bruno Mars, who previously had headlined the Super Bowl XLVII and Super Bowl XLVIII halftime shows, respectively. The show received mixed reviews, attracting 115.5 million viewers.

Background

Coldplay, Rihanna, and Katy Perry were considered as potential acts for the Super Bowl XLIX halftime show in 2015. Perry was soon confirmed as the headliner of the halftime show in November 2014. In summer 2015, many acts were being rumored as potential headliners for the 2016 halftime show including Taylor Swift, Britney Spears and One Direction. In September 2015, it was reported that Bruno Mars was set to curate the Super Bowl 50 halftime show, but the next month in October, It was reported that Maroon 5 was in talks to headline, but the band said they haven't had any conversations with the NFL about headlining, but were open to it. Maroon 5 would eventually headline Super Bowl LIII's halftime show.  In late November 2015, reports surfaced stating that multiple acts would perform during the halftime show. Coldplay was confirmed as the lead halftime performer for Super Bowl 50 on December 3, 2015, one day before the release of their seventh studio album A Head Full of Dreams. It was later confirmed that Beyoncé and Bruno Mars would join Coldplay as special guests. When Chris Martin originally called Mars to ask him to perform with Coldplay, Mars was wary of a multi-artist performance. The singer of Coldplay then invited Mars to his studio in Malibu where he was working. There, Martin revealed to Mars that he wanted for him to perform "Uptown Funk" with Beyoncé. Despite this, Mars remained skeptical and asked Martin to talk to Beyoncé to determine how she felt about the idea. Martin immediately texted a video of himself with Mars to Beyoncé, in which he asked her in the form of a song if she would come do the Super Bowl with both of them, to which she happily agreed. 

One day before the performance, Mars and Beyoncé were "watching playback backstage" while Beyoncé ate a bag of Cheetos. Mars asked her, "That's what you're doing?" to which she replied, "There's nothing more we can do these last two days. It's gonna be what it's gonna be. So I'm gonna enjoy this bag of Cheetos." Mars admitted to learning a lot watching Beyoncé's preparation for the Super Bowl performance, saying that she is "coming for you every single time, so you better bring your A-game every time."

Performance

The show opened with Chris Martin singing the opening chorus from "Yellow". He was then joined by the remaining band members of Coldplay to perform "Viva la Vida", "Paradise", and "Adventure of a Lifetime" with the Youth Orchestra Los Angeles conducted by Gustavo Dudamel and the University of California Marching Band. Bruno Mars, Mark Ronson, and a troupe of backing dancers (dressed in the styles of Michael Jackson) then performed "Uptown Funk". Beyoncé, also in a Michael Jackson-like bodysuit and appearing with a set of backing dancers dressed as Black Panthers, then performed her new single "Formation" in a mass choreographed dance number before joining Mars onstage for a verse of "Uptown Funk". Coldplay played a snippet of "Clocks" transitioning into "Fix You," and Martin sang along to some of the songs included in a video montage of past Super Bowl halftime and national anthem performances, containing show numbers by Bruce Springsteen, Missy Elliott, Katy Perry, The Rolling Stones, Paul McCartney, Stevie Wonder, Diana Ross, James Brown, Whitney Houston, Michael Jackson, The Black Eyed Peas, U2, Prince, Beyoncé, and Mars. The show concluded with the band performing "Up&Up" with Beyoncé, Mars, and everyone taking part in the show. At the end of the performance, the audience participated in a card stunt, creating a rainbow and the phrase "Believe in love."

Critical reception

The performance received generally mixed reviews from critics, who complimented Beyoncé and Mars' part of the performance but were critical of Coldplay. Jon Caramanica of The New York Times stated that Coldplay "acted more as a stagehand than an actual performer" while Beyoncé's section of the performance was "the night's true event". Caramanica also noted that Beyoncé and Mars "outsang" Martin during the closing part of the performance. Andrew Barker of Variety similarly noted that "Coldplay seemed resigned to politely allowing themselves to be played right off their own stage" by the "far flashier" Mars and Beyoncé. In a review for Fox Sports, Chris Chase panned Coldplay's performance, calling it "inexplicable, indecipherable, and unnecessary" and a "musical snooze". Chase complimented Beyoncé's and Mars' appearances but described the performance as "boring". Alex Needham of The Guardian gave the performance four stars, saying that "Queen Bey at the height of her powers effortlessly overwhelmed Coldplay's widescreen anthems in a show that seemed lightweight until she showed up".

Robert Bianco of USA Today stated that Martin "seemed overwhelmed" by the size of the event, and that despite being a "personable and energetic performer", an "awful lot" of Martin's energy "went into jumping". Bianco praised Beyoncé's appearance and stated that she "stole the show". Wendy Geller of Yahoo! also complimented Beyoncé's and Mars' appearances, but criticized the montage of previous halftime performances, describing it as "confusing rather than touching" and stating that the performance was "definitely a cold play".

Controversy
Following the performance, Beyoncé was criticized for performing her new single "Formation", a song that right-wing politicians and activists considered to be "anti-police", during the halftime show and for appearing to align herself with the Black Lives Matter movement. Former New York City mayor Rudy Giuliani accused the performance of being anti-police and also criticized Beyoncé's use of Black Power and Black Panther Party symbolism in her dance routine. "This is football, not Hollywood, and I thought it was really outrageous that she used it as a platform to attack police officers who are the people who protect her and protect us, and keep us alive," he said. The controversy caused a "#BoycottBeyonce" hashtag on Twitter and protesters announced plans for an "anti-Beyoncé" rally on the morning of February 16 outside of the NFL's headquarters in New York City, but no one showed up for such a rally. 

CNN political commentator Sally Kohn stated that "too many police continue to show themselves to be far more interested in reactionary defensiveness and preserving the abusive status quo." Black Lives Matter activist and professor Melina Abdullah praised Beyoncé and other artists who "are willing to raise social consciousness and use their artistry to advance social justice." In addressing her own controversy, Beyoncé explained, "I have so much admiration and respect for officers and the families of officers who sacrifice themselves to keep us safe. But let's be clear: I am against police brutality and injustice."

Commercial reception
The halftime show became the fourth-highest-watched show in the United States, with total viewership of 115.5 million.

Set list
 "Yellow"
 "Viva la Vida"
 "Paradise"
 "Adventure of a Lifetime"
 "Uptown Funk"  
 "Formation" 
 "Fix You" / "Up&Up" 

Setlist obtained from Billboard.

See also

 2016 in American music
 2016 in American television

References

External links
http://www.billboard.com/articles/news/super-bowl/6874799/bruno-mars-super-bowl-50-outfit-donatella-versace

February 2016 events in the United States
2016 in American music
2016 in American television
2016 in California
African-American-related controversies
Beyoncé
Bruno Mars
Coldplay
Race-related controversies in the United States
050
Television shows directed by Hamish Hamilton (director)
PepsiCo